Nebraska Highway 40 is a highway in central Nebraska. It has a western terminus at Nebraska Highway 92 in Arnold and an eastern terminus north of Kearney at an intersection with Nebraska Highway 10.

Route description
Nebraska Highway 40 begins in Arnold at an intersection with Nebraska Highway 92.  It goes south out of Arnold into farmland and at an intersection with Nebraska Highway 47, turns east.  It continues east until Nebraska Spur 21B, a spur road into Callaway, then turns southeasterly.  At Oconto, Highway 40 meets Nebraska Highway 21.  It continues in a southeasterly direction through Eddyville and Sumner and at Miller, meets U.S. Highway 183.  It continues southeast through Amherst and Riverdale and ends north of Kearney at an intersection with Nebraska Highway 10. Much of the alignment of Nebraska Highway 40 from Oconto southeastward to its eastern terminus lies parallel to the Wood River.

Major intersections

References

External links

Nebraska Roads: NE 21-40

040
Transportation in Custer County, Nebraska
Transportation in Dawson County, Nebraska
Transportation in Buffalo County, Nebraska